The 1989 Houston Oilers season was the franchise's 30th season and their 20th in the National Football League (NFL). The franchise scored 365 points while the defense gave up 412 points. Their record of 9 wins and 7 losses resulted in a second-place finish in the AFC Central Division. The Oilers appeared once on Monday Night Football and appeared in the playoffs for the third consecutive year. It would be Jerry Glanville’s final year as the Oilers coach. Despite making the playoffs, the Oilers, like their arch rivals, the Pittsburgh Steelers, had a negative point differential, making them the first teams since the 1984 Giants with this distinction.

Offseason

NFL draft

Personnel

Staff

Roster

Regular season

Schedule 

Note: Intra-division opponents are in bold text.

Playoffs

Standings

Game summaries

Week 3

Playoffs

AFC Wildcard Game 

Steelers defensive back Rod Woodson recovered a fumble to set up Gary Anderson's winning 51-yard field goal in overtime to give Pittsburgh the win. The Steelers scored first with running back Tim Worley's 1-yard rushing touchdown. But from that point on until the fourth quarter, the two teams exchanged 6 field goals. In the final period, Oilers quarterback Warren Moon, who finished the game with 315 passing yards, threw two touchdowns to wide receiver Ernest Givins, an 18-yarder and a 9-yarder. However, Pittsburgh running back Merrill Hoge tied the game on a 2-yard rushing touchdown with 46 seconds left in regulation.

Hoge finished the game with 100 rushing yards on just 17 carries, along with 3 receptions for 26 yards.

Awards and records 
 Ray Childress, 1989 AFC Pro Bowl selection
 Warren Moon, Pro Bowl
 Warren Moon, All-Pro selection
 Warren Moon, Man of the Year

Milestones 
 Warren Moon, 1st 400 Yard Passing Game (414)

References

External links 
 1989 Houston Oilers at Pro-Football-Reference.com

Houston Oilers
Houston Oilers seasons
Houston